Stefan Andrić; (born 2 April 1996) is a Serbian-born Macedonian footballer, who plays in the Swiss 1. Liga.

Club career
Born in Gornji Milanovac, Andrić moved in Radnički Kragujevac at the age of 15. After a few seasons spent with youth team, Andrić was promoted in the first team for the 2014–15 Serbian SuperLiga season and signed his first professional contract under coach Dragoljub Bekvalac, but later he missed the whole season because of injury. Andrić recovered an injury and returned in squad for the next season, and he made his debut for Radnički in the 2nd fixture of the 2015–16 Serbian First League season against Sloga Petrovac, under Neško Milovanović. During the first half-season, he collected 11 caps, mostly as a starter, but for the spring half of season, Radovan Radaković used him just two times on the field, in matches against Proleter Novi Sad and Napredak Kruševac.

In summer 2016, Andrić returned to Metalac Gornji Milanovac. After pre-season spent with the club, Andrić moved to Serbian League West side Šumadija 1903 for the 2016–17 Serbian League West season. He made his debut for new club in 4th fixture match, against Železničar Lajkovac, played on 3 September 2016.

At the beginning of 2017, Andrić moved to Greece, signing a year-and-a-half deal with Panserraikos.

International career
As his mother originating from Skopje, Andrić represented Macedonia at U-19 national team level.

Career statistics

References

External links
 

1996 births
Living people
People from Gornji Milanovac
Association football midfielders
Serbian footballers
Macedonian footballers
North Macedonia youth international footballers
FK Radnički 1923 players
FK Metalac Gornji Milanovac players
FK Šumadija 1903 players
Panserraikos F.C. players
Serbian First League players
Football League (Greece) players
Serbian expatriate footballers
Macedonian expatriate footballers
Serbian expatriate sportspeople in Greece
Macedonian expatriate sportspeople in Greece
Expatriate footballers in Greece
Serbian expatriate sportspeople in Switzerland
Macedonian expatriate sportspeople in Switzerland
Expatriate footballers in Switzerland

Macedonian people of Serbian descent